Calvin Chen (Pha̍k-fa-sṳ: Shìn Yi̍t-yî; Teochew pronunciation in Tâi-lô: Sîng Iā-dzû) is a Thai Chinese actor, businessman, model, singer, and television host. He was a member of the Taiwanese boy band Fahrenheit, along with Jiro Wang, Wu Chun and Aaron Yan.

Career

Music career
Chen was the third member to join boyband Fahrenheit in 2005.

On Fahrenheit's 2nd album, Chen sang the rap part of the song 心裡有數. He recorded his first solo for The X Family soundtrack entitled 你是我所有的回憶. He also sang his own version of 超喜歡你 on his 2010 series 愛似百匯. He frequently sings Fahrenheit's "Sexy Girl" during fan events, like what happened on the "When Love Walked In" event. Chen is supposed to sing a solo for the drama "When Love Walked In". Chen said in an interview that he plans to release his own solo album in late 2014 since his bandmates Aaron Yan and Jiro Wang have already released theirs.

Hosting career
After fellow band member Jiro Wang started hosting, Chen has also got a hosting job in MTV. He signed a one-season contract with MTV hosting the show 日韩音乐风 (aka: RHYYF, Japan Korea Music Craze). He replaced Ken Wu, who was host for the infotainment program during the last three years. Chen's first episode of this show was on Thursday 1 July 2010.

After a year of hosting, it is said that MTV will renew their contract with Calvin Chen.

Chen also hosted the "Pink Lipstick" Korean drama conference last year.

Through RHYYF and interviewing many Japanese and Korean artists and bands, Chen has built a reputation with fans of those artists as well.

Chen hosted as a substitute in many popular Taiwanese shows such as 100% Entertainment
(娱乐百分百) and Total Entertainment (完全娱乐)

On 18 August 2011, news confirmed that Chen is one of the seven hosts of a live show, Apple Entertainment News. The show had its pilot episode on 29 August without Chen because he was in Shanghai with Fahrenheit for the Eastern Camel Event.

Publication
On 21 May 2011, Chen released his solo photo book The Incredible Journey of Calvin Chen. (逆向旅程：辰亦儒溫哥華留學記) The book talks about Chen's life in Canada as a student and his path to fame as the Sunshine Boy. Two versions of the book were released, one comes with a DVD and the other is just the book.

Personal life
After graduating from Taipei Municipal Jianguo High School, one of the top high schools in Taiwan, he pursued his college education in Canada at Simon Fraser University. He completed his master's degree in Economics at the University of Victoria. He joined a pageant-like competition (Sunshine Boyz) in Vancouver, where he won first place with a free ticket to Taiwan, a contract with a music company, and go to Chulalongkorn University in thailand to do a bachelor's degree in economics, and a role in a drama in 2004. He became a member of Fahrenheit in 2005. He had enrolled in the graduate program in Public Finance at National Chengchi University, but discontinued his studies to focus on his showbiz career. He launched his fashion brand, WOW, in October 2008.

He announced marriage to the Taiwanese actress Joanne Tseng on 23 January 2020 on his Instagram account. He has been in relationship with Joanne Tseng for 10 years.

Chen speaks Mandarin, English, and Taiwanese and Thai language. He also understands conversational Cantonese as well as basic Korean and Japanese due to his work as a host.

Filmography

Film

Television series

TV and radio programs

Discography

References

External links

  Calvin Chen's Weibo microblog
  Calvin Chen's Instagram account
  
  H.I.M International Music
  Fahrenheit: Japan Official Site

1980 births
Living people
21st-century Taiwanese male  singers
Businesspeople in fashion
Fahrenheit (Taiwanese band) members
Male actors from Taipei
Musicians from Taipei
National Chengchi University alumni
Simon Fraser University alumni
Taiwanese idols
Taiwanese male television actors
Taiwanese Mandopop singers
Taiwanese television presenters
University of Victoria alumni
The Amazing Race contestants